This list of compositions by Leoš Janáček can be sorted by their genre, catalogue number (JW), date composed, Czech title, and English title. Click on the column headings. 

JW numbers are from Nigel Simeone, John Tyrrell, and Alena Němcová, Janáček's Works: A Catalogue of the Music and Writings of Leoš Janáček (Oxford: Clarendon Press, 1997). The correct format for JW numbers is Roman numeral (for the genre) before the slash and Arabic numeral (for the work) after the slash. Arabic numerals have been used throughout here for sortability.

References 
 Leoš Janáček Society

 
Janacek, Leos, List of compositions by
Janacek, Leos, List of compositions by